The 2021 Copa Colsanitas was a women's tennis tournament played on outdoor clay courts. It was the 23rd edition of the tournament and part of the 250 category of the 2021 WTA Tour. It took place at the Country Club in Bogotá, Colombia, from 5 April to 11 April 2021.

Champions

Singles 

  Camila Osorio def.  Tamara Zidanšek 5–7, 6–3, 6–4

Doubles 

  Elixane Lechemia /  Ingrid Neel def.  Mihaela Buzărnescu /  Anna-Lena Friedsam 6–3, 6–4

Points and prize money

Point distribution

Prize money 

*per team

Singles main-draw entrants

Seeds 

1 Rankings as of 22 March 2021.

Other entrants 
The following players received wildcards into the main draw:
  Emiliana Arango
  María Camila Osorio Serrano 
  Jessica Plazas

The following players received entry from the qualifying draw:
  Lara Arruabarrena
  Giulia Gatto-Monticone
  Nuria Párrizas Díaz
  Chloé Paquet
  Daniela Seguel
  Harmony Tan

Withdrawals 
Before the tournament
  Caroline Garcia → replaced by  Leonie Küng
  Kaja Juvan → replaced by  Irina Bara
  Nadia Podoroska → replaced by  Sachia Vickery
  Mayar Sherif → replaced by  Viktoriya Tomova
  Nina Stojanović → replaced by  Astra Sharma
  Patricia Maria Țig → replaced by  Mihaela Buzărnescu

Doubles main-draw entrants

Seeds 

 Rankings as of 22 March 2021.

Other entrants 
The following pairs received wildcards into the doubles main draw:
  Emiliana Arango /  María Camila Osorio Serrano
  Jessica Plazas /  Antonia Samudio

Withdrawals 
Before the tournament
  Kaitlyn Christian /  Sabrina Santamaria → replaced by  Beatrice Gumulya /  Jessy Rompies
  Sara Sorribes Tormo /  Nadia Podoroska → replaced by  Emina Bektas /  Tara Moore

References

External links 
 
 ITF tournament details

Copa Colsanitas
Copa Colsanitas
Copa Colsanitas
Copa Colsanitas